Project Runway Season 11 is the eleventh season of the television show Project Runway, appearing on Lifetime. The season began airing on January 24, 2013, with 16 designers competing to become "the next great American designer."

Supermodel Heidi Klum and Marie Claire fashion director Nina Garcia returned as judges this season. Tim Gunn returned as the workroom mentor. Zac Posen replaced Michael Kors as one of main judges due to scheduling conflicts with Kors.

Lord & Taylor was the exclusive retail sponsor for Project Runway's 11th season and has merchandised the accessory wall with an assortment of products.

In 2013, Daniel Esquivel competed in Project Runway All Stars (season 3), placing 10th of 11.

In 2014, Patricia Michaels, Kate Pankoke, Benjamin Mach, Samantha Black and Michelle Lesniak competed in Project Runway All Stars (season 4), with Patricia placing 14th, Kate placing 11th, Benjamin placing 10th, Samantha placing 8th, and Michelle placing 4th.

In 2016, Layana Aguilar competed in Project Runway All Stars (season 5), placing 7th of 13.

In 2018, Amanda Valentine and Stanley Hudson competed in Project Runway All Stars (season 6), with Amanda placing 11th and Stanley being the runner-up.

In 2019, Michelle Lesniak returned for a third time to compete in Project Runway All Stars (season 7) against worldwide Project Runway winners. She won the competition.

Contestants

Designers
Sources:

Models

 Lisa Jackson
 Katrina Topacio 
 Anna Kanehara
 Marina Tarakhovich 
 Blaga Slaveykova
 Liza Lyadova
 Catherine Gray
 Gina DeNezzo
 Kayla Mayhew
 Aisha Elizabeth
 Kayla Miller
 Eloho Erhieyovwe
 Brandi Vicks
 Carolyna Ramos
 Bianca Alexander
 Megan Cassidy

Teams

Season 11 challenges

 Scores are based on the Project Runway Website
: Before beginning the critique for Team Keeping it Real, Heidi Klum stated that she extremely disliked Richard's outfit and, had his team lost, he could've been in the bottom and/or out. Heidi also stated she did not like Stanley's dress at all and he also could've been in the bottom and/or out had Team Keeping it Real lost, and that they should be very grateful that their teammates were successful.
: Although Dream Team was named the winning team, Team Keeping It Real, despite their lack of cohesion, was also declared strong, and Heidi referred to them as the "almost-winning team", as opposed to being the losing team.
: Before allowing Patricia, Michelle, and Layana to leave the runway, Heidi stated that she gave Layana and Michelle the highest scores out of all the designers and would've been in the top had Patricia not scored very low. The judges also expressed that Kate would not have been in the bottom had Tu done better.
: Heidi and the judges declared in judging that due to the low scores in all the garments, there would be no winner of the challenge, a Project Runway first.
: Patricia and Michelle were left on the runway as the bottom two in this episode. After Heidi told Patricia that she was in, Michelle was the only one left. Though she lost the challenge, Heidi told her that she had a "do or die" moment, and would be given a second chance, much to the shock of her and her fellow remaining designers. It was revealed in the next episode that she was still in the competition but would not be traveling to Europe like the other remaining designers.
:Although Samantha had one of the lowest scores for the challenge, she was automatically safe as she had immunity

 Limegreen background and WINNER means the designer won Project Runway Season 11.
 Teal background and ADV means the designer was advanced to Fashion Week.
  Blue background and WIN means the designer won that challenge.
 Turquoise background and HIGH means the designer had the second highest score for that challenge.
  Light blue background and HIGH means the designer had one of the highest scores for that challenge.
  Pink background and LOW means the designers had one of the lowest scores for that challenge.
 Orange background and LOW means the designer was in the bottom two or three (as in episode 5).
  Red background and OUT means the designer lost and was out of the competition.

 The model won Project Runway Season 11.
  The model wore the winning design.
 The model wore the design with the second-highest score, or was in the winning team but did not win.
  The model wore the design with one of the highest scores but did not win.
  The model wore the design with one of the lowest scores. 
 The model wore the design that landed in the bottom 2.
  The model wore the losing design.
 The model was eliminated.
In episode 2, male models were used in the challenge with the models.
In episode 6 and 8, the models were not needed in the challenge.

Designer Legend
Amanda Valentine: AV
Benjamin Mach: BM
Cindy Marlatt: CM
Daniel Esquivel: DE
Emily Pollard: EP
James Martinez: JM
Joseph Aaron Segal: JS
Kate Pankoke: KP
Layana Aguilar: LA
Matthew Arthur: MA
Michelle Lesniak Franklin: MF
Patricia Michaels: PM
Richard Hallmarq: RH
Samantha Black: SB
Stanley Hudson: SH
Tu Suthiwat Nakchat: TN

Episodes

Episode 1: There is No 'I' in Team 
Original airdate: January 24, 2013

Season 11 returns with a twist that throws 16 eager new designers into a panic when they discover they will be participating in the series first-ever "Teams Edition." In the premiere episode, the designers will have New York as their inspiration in creating their garments.
 Guest Judge: Christian Siriano
 WINNER: Daniel (Keeping It Real)
 ELIMINATED: Emily (Dream Team)

Episode 2: Spin Out 
Original airdate: January 31, 2013

 The designers serve up ball-boy outfits and new server uniforms for a Ping-Pong social club. 
 Guest Judge: Susan Sarandon
 WINNER: Layana (Keeping It Real)
 ELIMINATED: James (Dream Team)

Episode 3: Surprise Me 
Original airdate: February 7, 2013

 The contestants are tasked to design garments for host Heidi Klum for the launch of her new fragrance line. Heidi will wear the winning garments in her national commercial and a second winning garment for a press event.
 Guest Judge: Kristin Davis
 WINNER: Kate (Keeping It Real) & Daniel (Keeping It Real)
 ELIMINATED: Cindy (Dream Team)

Episode 4: The Ultimate Hard and Soft 
Original airdate: February 14, 2013

 While the teams get a twist, the designers also get a blast from the past when two unconventional challenges are merged into one for their newest challenge—creating a line out of hard and soft materials from the flower shop and hardware store.
 Guest Judge: Bette Midler
 WINNER: Samantha (Dream Team)
 ELIMINATED: Joseph (Keeping It Real)

Episode 5: A Little Bit Country, A Little Bit Rock N Roll 
Original airdate: February 21, 2013

The designers are separated into teams of two to create a performance outfit and a red-carpet look for country artist Miranda Lambert, who is also the guest judge.

 Guest Judge: Miranda Lambert 
 WINNER: Richard (Partner – Stanley) 
 ELIMINATED: Matthew (Partner – Michelle)

Episode 6: Senior Fling 
Original airdate: February 28, 2013

 Fashionable clothes for senior citizens are created by the contestants
 Guest Judge: Rachel Roy (sitting in for Zac Posen) & Joan Rivers & Melissa Rivers
 WINNER: Stanley (Partner – Richard)
 ELIMINATED: Benjamin (Partner – Amanda)

Episode 7: A Sticky Situation 
Original airdate: March 7, 2013

 The contestants design fashion-forward prom looks constructed from duct tape.
 Guest Judge: Chris Benz
 WINNER: Michelle (Partner – Amanda)
 ELIMINATED: Kate (Partner – Tu) & Tu (Partner – Kate)

Episode 8: Take It All Off! 
Original airdate: March 14, 2013

 The contestants design outfits for the male revue Australia's Thunder from Down Under
 Guest Judge: Emmy Rossum
 WINNER: None
 ELIMINATED: Amanda (Slick And Hip)

Episode 9: He Said, She Said 
Original airdate: March 21, 2013

For this episode, the designers are instructed to draw inspiration from Lord & Taylor's signature "American Beauty Rose" and create a design with the retailer's customer in mind.
 Guest Judge: Rachel Roy (sitting in for Zac Posen) & Bonnie Brooks
 WINNER: Michelle (Partner – Daniel)
 ELIMINATED: Samantha (Partners – Layana & Richard)

Episode 10: The Art of Fashion 
Original airdate: March 28, 2013

The designers will go to the Solomon R. Guggenheim Museum and draw some inspiration from the artwork displayed to create their own textile designs for their outfit. The winning designer was also awarded $10,000 and an HP Envy X2.
 Guest Judge: Rachel Roy (sitting in for Zac Posen) & Tracy Reese
 WINNER: Stanley (Partner – Michelle)
 ELIMINATED: Richard (Partner – Patricia)

Episode 11: Finally on My Own 
Original airdate: April 4, 2013

The designers get the chance to show off their own aesthetic when they create editorial-worthy looks to be worn by actress Jordana Brewster in Marie Claire. At elimination Patricia and Michelle landed in the bottom two. Heidi said that they were giving Patricia another chance, making it appear that Michelle was being eliminated. However, Heidi told Michelle that she was getting another chance. Michelle must prove herself as the episode ends with uncertainty as to whether or not there will be an elimination.
 Guest Judge: Jordana Brewster
 WINNER: Stanley (Assistant – Tu)
 ELIMINATED: None

Episode 12: Europe, Here We Come 
Original airdate: April 11, 2013

The designers travel to Berlin, Barcelona, London and Paris to get inspiration for the final challenge before the finale. Michelle was given a second chance to stay in the competition in this episode, but would draw inspiration from New York City, rather than travelling to Europe with the other designers. 
 Guest Judge: John Legend
 WINNER: Stanley
 ELIMINATED: Layana (Assistant – Samantha)

Episode 13: Finale: Part 1 
Original airdate: April 18, 2013

The finalists work on their collections; Tim Gunn visits each of the finalists in their hometown.
 Guest Judge: None
ADVANCED TO FASHION WEEK: Michelle, Patricia, Stanley
ELIMINATED: Daniel

Episode 14: Finale: Part 2 
Original airdate: April 25, 2013

 The designers show their collections in the final runway show at Lincoln Center.
 Guest Judge: Michael Kors
 WINNER: Michelle
 ELIMINATED: Stanley & Patricia

Episode 15: Reunion Special 
Original airdate: May 2, 2013

After the Finale, the designers reunite to discuss their journey on Project Runway.

Trivia
Amanda Valentine is a younger sister of guitarist James Valentine of Maroon 5

References

External links 

Season 11
2013 American television seasons
2013 in fashion